Birhan Keskin (born 1963 in Kırklareli, Turkey) is a Turkish poet.

Life
She graduated in 1986 from Istanbul University with a degree in sociology and wrote her first poems in 1984. Between 1995 and 1998 she worked as editor for the magazine Göçebe (Nomad) as well as for other publishing houses in Istanbul.

Poetry

Poetry books in Turkish
 Delilirikler / Crazy Lyrics (İskenderiye Kütüphanesi Yayınları, 1991)
 Bakarsın Üzgün Dönerim / I May Return Unhappily (Era Yayıncılık, 1994)
 Cinayet Kışı + İki Mektup / Winter of Murder + Two Letters (Göçebe Şiir Kitapları, 1996)
 Yirmi Lak Tablet + Yolcunun Siyah Bavulu / 20 Polished Tablets + The Traveler’s Black Suitcase (YKY, 1999)
 Yeryüzü Halleri / States of the Earth (YKY, 2002)
 Y'ol / Road (2006)
 Soğuk Kazı (2010)
 Furkanın gülüşüne yazılan şiirler (2021)

Poems available in English
 The Winter of Murder / Cinayet Kışı (http://www.turkishpoetry.net/, 1996, translation by Nebile Direkcigil)
 & Silk & Love & Flame (Arc Publications, 2013, translation by George Messo) including the 3 poems "& Silk & Love & Flame", "Fig" and "Water"

Awards
Birhan Keskin was the winner of the following awards:

 Golden Orange Award (2005)
 Metin Altıok Poetry Award (2011)

References

External links

1963 births
Living people
20th-century Turkish poets
21st-century Turkish poets
20th-century Turkish women writers
20th-century Turkish writers
21st-century Turkish women writers
Istanbul University alumni
Turkish women poets
People from Kırklareli